Aaron Mpho Phangiso (born 21 January 1984) is an international South African cricketer who domestically plays for Northerns. He is a slow left arm orthodox bowler.

Domestic career
In August 2017, Phangiso was named in Bloem City Blazers' squad for the first season of the T20 Global League. However, in October 2017, Cricket South Africa initially postponed the tournament until November 2018, with it being cancelled soon after.

In June 2018, Phangiso was named in the squad for the Highveld Lions team for the 2018–19 season. In October 2018, he was named in Nelson Mandela Bay Giants' squad for the first edition of the Mzansi Super League T20 tournament. In September 2019, he was named in the squad for the Jozi Stars team for the 2019 Mzansi Super League tournament. In April 2021, he was named in Northerns' squad, ahead of the 2021–22 cricket season in South Africa.

International career
Phangiso made his international debut for South Africa on 23 December 2012 in a Twenty20 match against New Zealand. He bowled four overs (24 deliveries) and conceded 42 runs. He was included in the North West cricket team squad for the 2015 Africa T20 Cup.

References

External links

1984 births
Living people
People from Ga-Rankuwa
Sportspeople from Gauteng
South African cricketers
South Africa One Day International cricketers
South Africa Twenty20 International cricketers
Cricketers at the 2015 Cricket World Cup
Northerns cricketers
Titans cricketers
Lions cricketers
Gauteng cricketers
North West cricketers
Nelson Mandela Bay Giants cricketers
Jozi Stars cricketers